"Breaking Me Down" is a song by British singer Maria Lawson. It was released as a digital download on 6 September 2008 and released as a CD single on 8 September 2008.

Background
The B-side of the single is an acoustic version of "Sign Your Name", originally by Terence Trent D'arby. The song reached number 11 on the UK Indie Singles Chart. Lawson performed the song on 27 July 2008 at Party in the Park in Leeds and appeared on GMTV to promote the single.

Track listings
"Breaking Me Down" (3:34)
"Sign Your Name" (4:59)

Charts

References

Maria Lawson songs
2008 singles
2008 songs
Songs written by Michelle Escoffery